The second season of Thailand's Got Talent, a reality television series produced by Workpoint and premiered on May 14, 2012. This season is the first season without judge Nirut Sirijanya who was replaced with radio personality Jirayut Watthanasin. It is a talent show that features singers, dancers, sketch artists, comedians and other performers of all ages competing for the advertised top prize of 10,000,000 Baht (approximately $325,000).



Preliminary auditions
Producers' auditions were held in Khon Kaen, Chiang Mai, Bangkok, and Songkhla.

Controversies

'Boobs painting' 

The show is infamous for its fraud. One of the most controversial cases is that of a 23-year-old woman, Duangjai Jansaunoi, who unclothed herself before smearing herself in paint and gyrating against a canvas to dance music, shocking the three judges and the audience and bringing about negative criticism amongst the public. Also disputable was the two male judges who voted 'yes', saying it was an 'art'. The other judge, who is the only female, voted 'no', stating that "How can this be taken as an art? Anyone can do it. It is a kind of boldness, not a talent."

Thai minister of culture, Sukumol Kunplome condemned the act, declaring she was "shocked" seeing the clip, given the high numbers of spectators and the fact that it was televised at a time when children were likely to watch. She criticised that the show was broadcast inedited even though it was a recording and not live.

On June 18, 2012, the day after the show was broadcast, Workpoint executives were summoned by the Thai Government to give explanation why 'inappropriate' content was allowed when it could be edited. While TV3 faced an examination before the National Broadcasting and Telecommunications Commission (NBTC). The NBTC later issued an administrative act (Verwaltungsakt) imposing a fine of 500,000 baht on TV3 on account of indecency, and ordered the competent authorities to bring both civil and criminal cases against it.

National Artist Chalermchai Kositpipat also commented that the work the woman produced was of no artistic value, saying that "She merely copied the outermost shell of the foreign arts, without realising their substance. What she has done was a display of body, not the presentation of [artistic] integrity."

On June 19, the press stated its findings that the woman is a nude model and was hired for mere ten thousand baht to do so on the show so as to attract ratings. The next day, the woman's parents admitted that their daughter was hired, and pleaded with the public for pity, remarking that they are now detested by the locals even their youngest daughter (the woman's younger sister) was "openly regarded as dirty by her teachers and friends at school".

'Impoverished' singer 

Also questionable is another 32-year-old woman, Warunee Suwannarak, who appeared on the show and sang 4 Non Blondes' "What's Up" with English native speaker accent, contrary to the story she previously told that she merely completed elementary education and is living an impoverished life as a manual labourer. The story itself was also contrary to the pictures she shared on internet, showing her work as a local singer and her visits to many countries. This caused extensive criticism on internet, doubting her 'pitiable' story was set up by the organisers for the purpose of drawing public attentions. The woman later admitted that she married a foreigner, but still insisted that her story is true.

Format

Broadcast
 Audition for 5 weeks.
 Semi-Final 6 weeks.
 The final two weeks.
 The display is cut or not to broadcast will be released via the web. Site in the name. In Thailand gods of Morgan Lane West (Thailand's Got More Talent), as well as the original from England.

Audition
In March 2012, at the theater Aksara King Power Complex and Work Point studio for 6 days broadcast on Sunday From March 24 to April 1, 2015, 6 at which this cycle is a cycle that will be aired on television in many ways. Countries that do not have an opponent from round to round of auditions for the 321 participants must show their ability to express themselves within 2–4 minutes, which shall have the right to stop. the display. If one third of the people when the Buzzer will stop immediately. The Committee is asked to press the buzzer to stop by any of the Board of Directors will consider the ability to sound at least two of three in the competition to determine who enters the next round or not. Then the tape shows a selection of the finalists of the last remaining 36 shows. Into the finals.

Semi-final 
Finals will be broadcast live on the 36th of the last to audiences throughout the country for six weeks of studio work point. Pathum Thani province. Judging by the votes of the audience through SMS during a live person with the most votes will automatically be finalists. For those who have votes in the first two, and three judges will decide who is qualified by a two-thirds, as well as the fairly steep in this part of the show is taped before a three-hour to an hour. First added to prevent mistakes. The announcement will be broadcast live.

Semi-final summary
The "Number" columns lists the code of appearance each act made for every episode.

Semi-final 1 (15 July 2012)

Semi-final 2 (22 July 2012)

Semi-final 3 (29 July 2012)

Semi-final 4 (4 August 2012)

Semi-final 5 (19 August 2012)

Semi-final 6 (26 August 2012)

Grand final 
Finals are televised event of the last 12 directors will have the right to press the button. The bus's red. Is the same but without the majority vote of the board in any way. (However, in the introduction rules. MC stated that the Board will not hit the bus, Sir, during the show) in season two for the finals, it will show at the same time as season one, but it will not open by the first week of the season. it's the normal one and the time to 20:15 and the winner will be announced live at 20:15 to 20:30 hours on the day.

Rating

External links 
 Got Talent website(in Thai)

References

Thailand's Got Talent seasons
2012 Thai television seasons